Maham Begum or Mahim Begum (d. 16 April 1534) was the Empress consort of the Mughal Empire from 20 April 1526 to 26 December 1530 as the third wife and chief consort of Babur, the founder of the Mughal Empire and the first Mughal emperor. She was the mother of Babur's eldest surviving son and eventual successor, Humayun.

She was the first recipient of the imperial title Padshah Begum, a formal designation of being the first lady of the Mughal court. Maham Begum is also frequently mentioned in the Humayun-nama by her adoptive daughter Gulbadan Begum, who refers to her as "lady" and "my Lady" (aka and akam).

Family and lineage
Contemporary records give no specific information regarding Maham Begum's parentage. Babur's autobiography, the Baburnama, makes little mention of their wedding and says nothing about Maham's family. However, there is evidence to suggest that a certain Khwaja Muhammad Ali (referred to as "uncle" by Gulbadan) was Maham's brother. He appears several times in the Baburnama in association with the city of Khost, i.e being employed in the government of Khost, coming from Khost for orders etc. One of Maham's children was born in the city and Humayun was later recorded as visiting his maternal grandparents in Khost. Historian Annette Beveridge calls this family "quiet, unwarlike Khwajas". Babur also references a certain Abdul Malik Khosti who may also have been a relation of Maham's, though this is not certain. 

Abu'l-Fazl ibn Mubarak, the vizier of her grandson Akbar, states that Maham was from a noble family of Khorasan, descendants of the 11th century Sufi mystic Sheikh Ahmad Jami. This was a lineage that she shared with her daughter-in-law, Hamida Banu Begum. He also mentions that she was a relation of Sultan Husayn Bayqara, the Timurid ruler of Herat. Though the exact relationship is not given, the wording used by Abu'l Fazl (nisbat-i-khwesh) may imply a blood-relation on her father's side. Consequently, Babur's marriage with Maham shortly after Sultan Husayn's death may have been a sign of condolence to her grieving royal relations. 

There are also hints to further Timurid relationships. Gulbadan, Maham Begum's adopted daughter, states that the empress was related to the owners of the New Year's Garden in Kabul, originally constructed by Ulugh Beg II, a paternal uncle of Babur. In addition, some considerations suggest that Gulbadan's mother, Dildar Agacha Begum, was also a relation of Maham's. Dildar herself is theorised to have been a daughter of another of Babur's uncles, Sultan Mahmud Mirza.

Marriage
Babur married her in 1506 at Herat, when on the death of Sultan Husayn Mirza, he paid a condolence visit to Herat capital of Khosran. She was mentioned as "the one who was to Babur" what Aisha was to Muhammad. She played an active role in the political affairs of Babur as well as in the royal household. She had the qualities of extreme intelligence and good looks. She accompanied her husband to Badakhshan and Transoxiana and stood by him through thick and thin. She was the chief lady of the royal household. Upon the birth of the couple's first child, Humayun. Another four children were born to her and unfortunately all died in infancy. They were Barbul, Mihr Jahan, Aisan Daulat and Faruq.

As Babur's chief consort, she had well defined rights over other inmates of his harem. She herself took her own guardianship of, two Dildar Begum's children, Hindal Mirza and Gulbadan Begum in 1519 and 1525 respectively and Babur's affirmation of it, though she already possessed five children. A devoted mother, Maham spent all her spare time to educate the prince in values dear to her. She would narrate to him stories connected with her ancestor Shaikh Ahmad Jam and other renowned holy personages of his time.

As empress
In 1528, Maham Begum came to Hindustan from Kabul. When she reached Aligarh, Babur sent two litters with three horsemen. She went on post haste from Aligarh to Agra. Babur had intended to go as far as Aligarh to meet her. At evening prayer time someone came and said to Babur that he had just passed Maham Begum on the road, four miles out. Babur did not wait for a horse to be saddled but sat out on foot. He met her near the house of Maham's advance camp. She wished to alight, but he would not wait, and fell into her train and walked to his own house. Nine troopers with two sets of nine horses and the two extra litters which the Emperor had sent, and one litter which had been brought from Kabul, and about a hundred of Maham Begum's servants mounted on fine horses. After staying three months at Agra, Maham Begum went to Dholpur with Babur.

Maham Begum was the chief queen and the only one, privileged to sit by the side of Babur on the throne of Mughal Empire. She was powerful, moody and spoil and it seems Babur denied her nothing. It is worth of noticing that “Babur speaks of his favorite wife, Maham Begum’s edict as a farman.” During Humayun's illness Babur walked round him and turned his face. He also exclaimed that he loved Humayun because he was the son of his favourite wife, Maham by saying, "Although I have other sons, I love none as I love your Humayun. I crave that this cherished child may have his heart's desire and live long, and I desire the kingdom for him and not for the others, because he has not his equal in distinction."

As empress dowager
After Humayun was restored to health, Babur became ill and died. Humayun ascended the throne at twenty three-years of age. Maham Begum made an allowance of food twice daily. In the morning an ox and two sheep and five goats, and at afternoon prayer time five goats. She gave this from her own estate during the two and a half years. During Babur's illness, he laid a command on Maham Begum, the charge to arrange marriages of Gulrukh Begum and Gulchehra Begum. Maham Begum received her cleverness of the conspiracy and bade Humayun to return from Badakhshan. She played an important role in promoting successfully the cause of Humayun. She continued to be Padshah Begum and participated in the affairs of the imperial household organization of social functions and the maintenance of her husband's tomb, until her death.
 
After Humayun's return from Chunar, Maham Begam, gave a great feast. They lit up the bazaars. Then she gave orders to the better class and to the soldiers also to decorate their places and make their quarters beautiful, and after this illumination became general in India. With all her stores of replenishing, she made an excellent and splendid feast. She gave special robes of honour to 7,000 persons. The festivities lasted several days.

Death
In April Maham Begum was attacked by a disorder of the bowels. On the 16th of the same month she died. After the death of Maham, Khanzada Begum, Babur's sister, became the first-lady of the Empire.

It is not known where she was buried and which place was chosen to be her tomb by her son Humayun who was then reigning. She seems to have been buried alongside the grave of Babur. It is certain, however, that her body was never transferred to Kabul.

Popular Culture

Maham Begum was portrayed by Sahher Bambba in the Hotstar Web series The Empire released on 27th August, 2021

References

Bibliography

External links
Humayun nama, Chapter 4: Hostilities arise, the battle against Rana Sanga at Fathpur Sikri and Babur's victory, Maham Begam and Gul-badan move to Agra
Humayun nama, Chapter 5: Humayun's illness, Babur's death, Humayun becomes Emperor
Humayun nama, Chapter 6: Maham Begam's feast and death, the Mystic Feast and Mirza Hindal's marriage feast, Bega Begam's complaints to Humayun

Wives of Babur
1535 deaths
Queen mothers
Year of birth unknown
16th-century Indian women
16th-century Indian people
Deaths from digestive disease
People from Khorasan
Mothers of Mughal emperors